The Saffrons is a multi-purpose sports ground in Eastbourne, East Sussex. The ground is home to Eastbourne Cricket Club, Eastbourne Town Football Club, Eastbourne Hockey Club and Compton Croquet Club. There is also a sand dressed astroturf pitch.
The sports ground is located on the edge of Eastbourne town centre, next to the town hall and is in easy reach of local transport links. The ground was first used in 1884. Sussex County Cricket Club played some of their matches there between 1896 and 2000, and recently from 2017.

The complex has:
 A football pitch.
 Two cricket pitches, one of which is named Larkins field.
 An Astroturf Hockey pitch. 
 A Croquet lawn.
 Sports bar and changing facilities.

Football

The Saffrons is home to Eastbourne Town F.C., who play in the Southern Combination Football League and who have played football here since 1886, when the then Devonshire Park Football Club moved grounds from their former namesake (now the venue for the Eastbourne International tennis tournament). Devonshire Park Football Club changed their name to Eastbourne in 1889 and the 'Town' suffix was added in 1971. 

Eastbourne Town Women also play their home games here. 

The Larkins Field End, where the clubhouse stands, was originally a wooden grandstand structure, built in the 1930s when attendances at the town club were increasing. The Town Hall side, now known as the East Terrace was asphalted at the same time. The wooden grandstand was destroyed by an arson attack in 1969. The stand was rebuilt but lost its roof in the 1987 hurricane. The current stand today, known as the Taffy Jones/Sid Mayall stand was built in 1994, 25 years after the original grandstand was destroyed.

In 1946, the pitch was moved closer to the cricket ground to lay foundations for the East Terrace, which still remains today. The Meads Road side of the terrace had the covered stand built in 1962. There are wooden benches in this stand.

Floodlights were installed in 1994 and during the 1990s a clubhouse, new dressing rooms and a tea bar have been built behind the stand.

The West Terrace, where the team dugouts are situated once had a movable fence depending on when either the football or the cricket was playing. In recent years the cricket green was moved slightly away to allow a permanent fence and asphalt laid for spectators to stand.

The main turnsite was originally built in 1914 and was destroyed by a fire in February 2004 but restored before the new season started.

The ground plays host to many county cup finals at youth and intermediate level. The capacity of the football ground is 3,000, with seating for 200 spectators.

Stands
 The Sid Myall & Taffy Jones Stand previously known as the Larkins Field End, has seating for 200 spectators, also the tea bar, hot food hut and toilets. The players changing rooms are also in this stand.
 East Terrace is an open air terrace running for two thirds of the pitch, the other first has a covered terrace, previously sponsored and named the Hopkins Estate agents stand.
 Meads Road End sometimes known as the Bell End due to the close proximity of the Town Hall clock tower, is an open air terrace with a temporary stand borrowed from the cricket pitch for seating. 
 West Terrace is an open air stand. The team dugouts are situated along this stand.

Other uses
As well as being home to Eastbourne Town, the ground has been used as training ground for the England National Football Team in May 1954. And between 1955 and 1957, Manchester City visited Eastbourne and trained at The Saffrons in preparation for the FA Cup finals against Newcastle United (1955) and Birmingham City (1956).

The Saffrons has hosted both amateur and county football events:

Amateur Football Alliance Senior Cup
 1909–1910, 1937–38

Corinthian League Challenge Shield
 1951–52

Sussex Senior Challenge Cup
 1935–36

Records
The highest attendance to date was 7,378, in a FA Cup qualifying game against Hastings United on 10 October 1953.

Cricket

Eastbourne Cricket Club

The cricket ground is home to Eastbourne Cricket Club, who play in the Sussex Cricket League. Formed in the 1750s, the club played at various venues in Eastbourne, before moving to the Saffrons. The venue saw its first game of cricket played in 1884.

The ground has also hosted a single Women's One Day International match between England women and New Zealand in the 1973 Women's Cricket World Cup.

There was once a pavilion at one end of the ground which was destroyed by fire in 1947, a replacement was built which was also damaged by fire in 1977.

The ground has a capacity of 4,500.

Sussex County Cricket Club

The Saffrons hosted 226 first-class matches between 1896 and 2000. Most of these involved Sussex County Cricket Club, but (especially in earlier years) a number of tour and invitational sides played here too.
The inaugural first-class match at the Saffrons was played in May 1896, when South of England drew with the touring Australians.
The ground hosted 32 List A matches between 1970 and 2000,
and one match each of Youth and Women's One-Day Internationals, as well as Sussex Second XI games.

County cricket returned to the Saffrons in May 2017 when Sussex played Gloucestershire in a Royal London One-Day Cup match.

Records

First-class
Highest team total: 676/8 declared by Harlequins v West Indians, 1928
Lowest team total: 38 by Sussex v Hampshire, 1950
Charles Knott returned figures of 7-4-5-5 in this innings
Highest individual innings: 310 by Harold Gimblett for Somerset v Sussex, 1948
The first triple century for Somerset
Best bowling in an innings: 9-62 by Tony Nicholson for Yorkshire v Sussex, 1967
Best bowling in a match: 14-84 by Hugh Trumble for Australians v England XI, 1902

List A
Highest team total: 262 (48.3 overs) by Sussex v Nottinghamshire, 1993
Lowest team total: 63 (37.4 overs) by Minor Counties East v Sussex, 1978
Highest individual innings: 109 by Roger Knight for Sussex v Leicestershire, 1976
Best bowling in an innings: 5-19 by Michael Buss for Sussex v Minor Counties East, 1978

Hockey
Eastbourne Hockey Club have a sand dressed artificial grass pitch behind the Football Ground. Originally built in 1964, it was refurbished in 2015.

Eastbourne Hockey Club currently have a men's team and a ladies team, as well as a veterans team and a junior team. 
 Eastbourne Hockey Club Men competing in The South Hockey League Premier - Division 2 
 Eastbourne Hockey Club Ladies competing in the South Clubs Women's Hockey League - Division 3B

Rugby
Eastbourne Rugby Club played their home games here between 1892 and 1934 using both the football pitch and the field behind, known as Larkins Field. The first recorded game was in December 1892 against Brighton Football Club.

The rugby club used the Saffrons Number 1 pitch on Wednesdays, where Eastbourne Town currently play their games, and other games on Larkins Field, behind the hockey pitch. In the 1894–95 season, the rugby club used "The New Inn", now called Bibendum, the opposite side of the road as their Headquarters and dressing rooms.

In 1934 the rugby club moved to their present home in Hampden Park. Larkins Field is now a spare cricket pitch for local teams in the area.

References

External links
 The Saffrons Sports Ground
 Eastbourne Town Football Club
 Eastbourne Cricket Club
 The Saffrons, Eastbourne from CricketArchive
 The Saffrons, Eastbourne - Records from CricketArchive
 Eastbourne Town F.C. from Nomad Online

Eastbourne Town F.C.
Sport in Eastbourne
Cricket grounds in East Sussex
Sports venues completed in 1884
Sports venues in East Sussex
Buildings and structures in Eastbourne
Football venues in England